Nina Karin Monsen (born 29 May 1943) is a Norwegian moral philosopher and author. She has written several books, both non-fiction and fiction, and has been active in Norwegian public debate since the early 1970s.

Life
Monsen has a Magister's degree in Philosophy (1969) and was one of the founders of the Norwegian new feminist movement in 1970. Her early work was on the logician Quine and she later studied feminist philosophy. She has become the most visible proponent of Personalism in Norway, with Det elskende menneske (The loving human being, 1987) as her most central work.

Monsen grew up in a humanist family, and later converted to Christianity. She lectures in evangelical churches.

She was appointed a government scholar in 2004. In 2009, she was awarded the Fritt Ord Award.  

She was married to legal scholar Helge Johan Thue, until he died in 2010.

Publications

Non-fiction
 Det kvinnelige menneske. Aschehoug, 1975
 Jomfru, mor eller menneske Universitetsforlaget, 1984
 Det elskende menneske, person og etikk (1987)
 Det Kjempende menneske, person og etikk (1990)
 Velferd uten ansikt, en filosofisk analyse av velferdsstaten (1998)
 Kunsten å tenke, en filosofisk metode til et bedre liv (2001)
 Den gode sirkel, en filosofi om helse og kjærlighet (2002)
 Det sårbare menneske, en filosofi om skam, skyld og synd (2004)
 Livstro, lesetykker (2005)
 Det innerste valget (2007)
 Kampen om ekteskapet og barnet (2009)

Fiction
 Under Godhetens synsvinkel, essays, 1992
 Kvinnepakten, novel, 1977
 Jammersminne, novel, 1980
 Dødt liv, short stories, 1987
 Inntrengere, novel, 1989
 Tvillingsjeler, novel, 1993

References 

1943 births
20th-century Norwegian philosophers
21st-century Norwegian philosophers
Converts to Christianity
Feminist philosophers
Living people
Norwegian Christians
Norwegian women academics
Writers from Bergen
Academic staff of the University of Oslo
Norwegian women philosophers
Proponents of Christian feminism
Postmodern feminists